Herbert Marcus (September 6, 1878 – December 11, 1950) was one of the co-founders of Neiman Marcus, and later became its chief executive officer.

Biography
Born to a Jewish family in Kentucky, Marcus moved to Hillsboro, Texas after dropping out of high school to work and live near his brother Theodore, his three sisters and his parents.  His various retail, sales and janitorial positions helped him escape the economic hardships of life in Kentucky.  He moved to Dallas, Texas in 1899 and married Minnie Lichtenstein, the mother of his four sons, in 1902.  They moved to Atlanta with his sister Carrie and her husband Abraham Lincoln Neiman to work for The Coca-Cola Company.  Their success was rewarded with a buyout of $25,000 in exchange for giving up the sales territories in Kansas and or Missouri of the nascent soft drink concern.  This $25,000 enabled the Neiman and Marcus families to establish Neiman Marcus in Dallas in 1907.

Neiman-Marcus specialized in ready made high quality clothes for women at a time when visiting a tailor and or doing extensive alterations at home was the norm.  Business grew quickly as cotton and later oil and other industries and population growth buoyed the Texas economy.  In 1928 his sister Carrie divorced A. L. Neiman, Herbert bought out Neiman's share, and Neiman-Marcus came entirely under Marcus family control.  Herbert became president of Temple Emanu-El (Dallas, Texas), was a director of the Dallas Museum of Art and held many other civic positions to bolster the culture and well being of the city that made Neiman-Marcus thrive.  The Marcus family negotiated with Condé Nast of Condé Nast Publications and Neiman-Marcus became the first concern located West of the Atlantic Seaboard to advertise luxury fashion in their magazines.

During World War II Herbert and the Marcus family and employees helped Neiman-Marcus showcase clothing and lifestyles that would be most helpful with regards to rationing and other wartime realities.  The post war years brought more lavish fashion shows and finery into Neiman-Marcus as luxury goods returned to fashionability.  Carrie Marcus Neiman and Herbert's sons took increasing responsibility for both fashion and business decisions as Herbert aged.  After Herbert's death in 1950 his sister Carrie  and then his son Stanley Marcus took over top management positions.

At one time Herbert Marcus lived in the Lakewood neighborhood in Dallas.

References

1878 births
1950 deaths
American Jews
American businesspeople in retailing
American art collectors
American retail chief executives
Jews and Judaism in Dallas
Businesspeople from Louisville, Kentucky
People from Hillsboro, Texas